Andreas Pilavakis (born 15 February 1959) is a Cypriot alpine skier. He competed in two events at the 1980 Winter Olympics.

References

1959 births
Living people
Cypriot male alpine skiers
Olympic alpine skiers of Cyprus
Alpine skiers at the 1980 Winter Olympics
Place of birth missing (living people)